Muttath Suresh (born  19 May 1978) is a former Indian footballer. He is a defender, former indian player, former east bengal club captain, federation cup winning captain for east bengal, two time national league winner, IFA Shield winner, ASEAN Club Championship winner.

Career
For the 2010-11 football season Suresh will play for United Sikkim FC in the I-League 2nd Division.

Honours

India
SAFF Championship: 2005; third place: 2003

East Bengal
ASEAN Club Championship: 2003

References

External links
 

Indian footballers
India international footballers
Living people
1978 births
East Bengal Club players
Association football defenders
Footballers from Kerala
Mohun Bagan AC players
Mahindra United FC players